Patak may refer to:

Places
Hungary
 Patak, Hungary
 Iran
 Patak, Ilam, a village in Ilam Province
 Patak-e Arab, "Arab Patak", a village in Ilam Province
 Patak-e Bajgan, a village in Kerman Province
 Patak-e Beygdeli, a village in Khuzestan Province
 Patak-e Jalali, a village in Khuzestan Province
 Kohneh Patak, "Old Patak", a village in Mazandaran Province
 Tazeh Patak, "New Patak", a village in Mazandaran Province

People with the surname
Evan Patak (born 1984), American volleyball player
Matej Paták (born 1990), Slovak volleyball player

See also
Patak's, a former spice company, now a brand of the Associated British Foods group
Pataki (disambiguation)